Ismail Mohamed Osman Shaqale was the Chief of Army of Somaliland. He was appointed as the Chief of Staff after General Mohamed Hasan Abdullahi (also known as “Jidif”) was fired after 90 days on the job.

References

Living people
Military in Somaliland
Somalian military leaders
Somalian generals
Year of birth missing (living people)